British Rail Class D3/3 was a 0-6-0 shunting locomotive built by British Rail at their Derby Works in England. It was similar to the British Rail Class 08, except they were built with different engines and traction motors. They were all withdrawn and scrapped after only twelve years of service.

See also

 List of British Rail classes

Sources

 Ian Allan ABC of British Railways Locomotives, Winter 1962/3
 

D003.03
C locomotives
Railway locomotives introduced in 1955
Scrapped locomotives
Standard gauge locomotives of Great Britain
Diesel-electric locomotives of Great Britain